The Texas–Arlington Mavericks football program was a college football team that represented the University of Texas at Arlington from the 1959 through 1985 seasons. Between 1919 through 1958, UTA competed as a junior college prior to moving to Division II in 1959 and ultimately Division I in 1970. UTA played its home games at multiple stadiums throughout their history with the most recent being Maverick Stadium, in Arlington, Texas.

The following is a list of Texas–Arlington Mavericks head football coaches.  The first head coach of the program was L. William Caine, who began when the program was in its junior college phase.  The final coach was Chuck Curtis.

Key

Coaches
Statistics correct as of the end of the 2012 college football season.

Notes

References

Texas-Arlington Mavericks

Texas–Arlington Mavericks football